The 2021 Gateshead Metropolitan Borough Council election took place on 6 May 2021 to elect members of Gateshead Metropolitan Borough Council in England on the same day as other local elections. One-third of the seats were up for election, with two wards (Birtley and Lamesley) electing two councillors.

Results

Ward results

Birtley

Blaydon

Bridges

Chopwell and Rowlands Gill

Chowdene

Crawcrook and Greenside

Deckham

Dunston and Teams

Dunston Hill and Whickham East

Felling

High Fell

Lamesley

Lobley Hill and Bensham

Low Fell

Pelaw and Heworth

Ryton Crookhill and Stella

Saltwell

Wardley and Leam Lane

Whickham North

Whickham South and Sunniside

Windy Nook and Whitehills

Winlaton and High Spen

References 

Gateshead
Gateshead Council elections